Alaska Airlines is a major American airline headquartered in SeaTac, Washington, within the Seattle metropolitan area. It is the seventh largest airline in North America when measured by fleet size, scheduled passengers carried, and the number of destinations served. Alaska, together with its regional partners Horizon Air and SkyWest Airlines, operates a route network primarily focused on connecting cities along the West Coast of the United States to over one hundred destinations in the contiguous United States, Belize, Canada, Costa Rica, and Mexico.

The airline operates out of five hubs, with its primary hub being at Seattle–Tacoma International Airport. Alaska Airlines is a member of Oneworld, the third-largest airline alliance in the world. As of 2020, the airline employs over 16,000 people and has been ranked by J. D. Power and Associates as having the highest customer satisfaction of the traditional airlines for twelve consecutive years.

History

Early years (1932–1945)

McGee Airways, a precursor to Alaska Airlines, was established by Linious "Mac" McGee and flew its first service between Anchorage and Bristol Bay. Service was unscheduled with flights taking off when there were passengers or a load of cargo or mail.

The airline struggled financially during the Great Depression. There were too many airlines in Anchorage at the time, and not enough demand to support them. This allowed McGee to enter the mining industry. With a fleet of fifteen aircraft, Star Air Service was a dominant airline in Alaska. But Star continued to struggle financially because of high maintenance costs for its wood and fabric planes.

In 1937, McGee came back to the airline and opened a liquor store, and the airline began flying liquor to remote Alaskan communities. That year, Star Air Service purchased Alaska Interior Airlines and was incorporated as Star Air Lines. Star was again sold later that year to a group of miners.

In 1938, federal regulation began when Congress created the Civil Aeronautics Board (CAB). The CAB awarded the airline most of the routes that it wanted in Alaska, but the coveted route between Seattle and Anchorage was awarded to Pan American Airways.

In 1941, Star Air Service was purchased by Raymond Marshall, a businessman from New York. In 1942, the airline purchased three other airlines in Alaska, Lavery Air Service, Mirow Air Service, and Pollack Flying Service as well as a hangar at the Anchorage airport. That year, the airline's name was changed to Alaska Star Airlines. The name Alaska Airlines was adopted on May 2, 1944, having narrowly beaten a competitor who was also applying for the name. In the 1940s Alaska's headquarters were in Anchorage.

When the United States entered World War II in December 1941, Alaska Airlines faced a shortage of pilots. During the war, the airline lacked funds and equipment, and pilots were often forced to buy fuel for their planes out of their own pockets. The company, which was frequently subjected to lawsuits, also went through many different presidents during this time. In 1943, Alaska Airlines purchased the Lockheed Model 18 Lodestar, its first multi-engine aircraft. That same year the company's stock was traded for the very first time on the American Stock Exchange.

Expansion after World War II (1945–1949)

In 1945, Alaska Airlines hired its first stewardesses. In 1947, jockey James Wooten became president of the airline and he began to expand the airline greatly. Under his leadership, the company purchased many surplus military aircraft from the government that were used during World War II. The airline purchased Douglas DC-3s, Douglas DC-4s and Curtiss-Wright C-46 Commandos. Alaska Airlines was the first carrier certified to operate DC-3s on skis.

Alaska Airlines' large charter business made it profitable, and the airline moved its base of operations to Paine Field, an airport north of Seattle. It kept a branch office in Anchorage, however. Despite its success, Alaska Airlines' worldwide charter business was short-lived. In 1949, the CAB tightened its regulations and placed heavy fines on the airline and shut it down completely for safety violations. The airline was prohibited from operating worldwide charter flights, and president James Wooten left the company.  Also in 1949, Alaska Air began operating five Bell 47B helicopters in order to support oil exploration on the North Slope thus becoming the first airline in Alaska to operate rotary-wing aircraft.

In 1949, the airline was a major participant in an effort by the newly established state of Israel to airlift Jews out of Yemen to Israel in what became known as Operation Magic Carpet. C-46 or DC-4 aircraft were used for the nearly 3,000-mile flight, made necessary to avoid overflying Arab nations. Planes flew from Eritrea to Aden, then along the Gulf of Aqaba to Tel Aviv. After unloading the refugees, crews then immediately continued to Cyprus, afraid to stay on the ground in Tel Aviv for fear of being bombed. Some 49,000 Yemenite Jews were airlifted by Alaska Airlines and other carriers without a single loss of life.

New leadership (1950s)
Alaska Airlines started the 1950s without its worldwide charter business and operations restricted to the state of Alaska. In 1950, it purchased two smaller Alaskan airlines, Collins Air Service and Al Jones Airways.

Though the airline had grown much under the ownership of Raymond Marshall, the CAB forced him out in 1951 due to continuing financial troubles. Also, Marshall had owned Alaska Airlines with the intent of getting money for himself and he was not concerned about the long-term stability of the company. In 1951, the CAB awarded Alaska Airlines with a temporary certificate allowing them to operate on routes from the Alaskan cities of Anchorage and Fairbanks to Seattle and Portland in the contiguous United States; this award would become permanent in 1957.

In 1952, the CAB appointed Nelson David as president, and he began to improve the financial stability of the airline. By 1957, with the carrier in a better financial situation, David left and Charles Willis, Jr. became the company's new president and CEO. A pilot during World War II, Willis introduced several marketing gimmicks that set the airline apart from other ones of the day. Under his leadership, Alaska Airlines became the first to show inflight movies. The company began service with the Douglas DC-6, the airline's first pressurized plane, enabling flights above clouds and weather disturbances. On these DC-6s, the airline introduced "Golden Nugget" service, which included an on-board saloon and piano.

Jet age (1960s)

In 1961, competitors began introducing jets on routes Alaska Airlines flew. To counter this competition, Willis negotiated with aircraft manufacturer Convair to purchase a Convair 880 jetliner with no money down for use on routes between Alaska and the contiguous United States. The company introduced the new jet aircraft the same year. In 1966 the company received its first Boeing 727-100 jets and removed the Convair 880 from the fleet as a financing condition by Boeing concerning the purchase of the 727 jetliners. Several of Alaska's first 727s were series 100C models which could be operated either as all cargo freighters, in an all passenger configuration or as mixed passenger/freight combi aircraft. In the spring of 1967, greatly increased passenger loads required quick addition of fleet aircraft and Alaska purchased a Convair 990 jetliner formerly operated by Brazilian air carrier Varig as PP-VJE which then became Alaska Airlines N987AS. This aircraft remained in service along with an increased fleet of Boeing 727-100's which were then joined by stretched Boeing 727-200s which in turn became Alaska Airlines' signature aircraft for the next 25 years. It also became the first carrier to fly the Lockheed L-100 Hercules (L382 model), the civil version of the military C-130 cargo turboprop, which was used to transport oil drilling rigs to Alaska's North Slope and later to Ecuador. Alaska also owned Lockheed Constellation propliners including two Lockheed L-1649A Starliners from 1962 to 1968, and three L-1049's which were used for Military Air Transport Service operations. Smaller prop and turboprop aircraft were also operated, including the Convair 240, de Havilland Canada DHC-6 Twin Otter and Super Catalina amphibian aircraft as well as two versions of the Grumman Goose amphibian aircraft, one with piston engines and the other model being a conversion to turboprop engines which the airline called the "Turbo-Goose". The Catalina and Grumman amphibian seaplane aircraft joined the fleet when the airline acquired local southeast Alaska operator Alaska Coastal Airlines in 1968.

During this time, Alaska Air faced some tough competition from other airlines such as Northwest Airlines, Pan Am, and Pacific Northern Airlines, an Alaska-based air carrier operating Boeing 720 jetliners that was subsequently acquired by and merged into Western Airlines in 1967. Northwest and Pan Am at different times operated Boeing 747 wide body jetliners on their services to Alaska with Northwest flying Seattle–Anchorage nonstop with the jumbo jet and Pan Am flying Seattle–Fairbanks nonstop with the 747.  To set itself apart from the competition, Alaska Air turned to some cheap but imaginative gimmicks such as having safety instructions read as rhymes, staging fashion shows in the aisles and having bingo games on board while en route.

In December 1962 Air Guinée signed a contract with Alaska Airlines which saw the latter company providing management expertise, in addition to two Douglas DC-4s. The deal would have seen Alaska Airlines contracting with the airline over a seven-year period but the contract ended after only six months, leading to the United States Agency for International Development paying a US$700,000 debt owed by the Guinean airline to Alaska Airlines.

In 1965, Alaska Airlines turned over some routes between small Alaskan communities, as well as some smaller aircraft, to Wien Air Alaska. This allowed Alaska to focus on more heavily traveled routes and allowed them to sell off smaller aircraft.

Throughout the 1960s, Alaska Airlines worked to promote tourism to Alaska by offering charter flights to the continental United States. In an attempt to increase the state's appeal, Alaska Airlines conducted a promotional tour of Japan in 1963. In 1967, as the state of Alaska celebrated its centennial, Alaska Airlines introduced a promotional "Gay Nineties" theme with stewardesses dressed in Edwardian outfits. That year, Alaska Airlines expanded to southeast Alaska with the introduction of service to Sitka. This led to the purchase of two smaller airlines, Alaska Coastal Airlines and Cordova Airlines, in 1968.

Economic hardship (1970s)

In the beginning of the 1970s, Alaska Airlines began Boeing 707 charter flights to Siberia in the Soviet Union. This was the result of three years of secret negotiations between Alaska Airlines and Soviet authorities, in which the US Department of State reluctantly chose not to block the plan for fear of a potentially negative response from the Soviets. The airline gained permission to fly more than two dozen flights in 1970, 1971, and 1972. Alaska Airlines was also operating Boeing 707, Boeing 720, and Boeing 720B jetliners in scheduled passenger service between destinations in Alaska and Seattle during the early and mid-1970s.

However, the airline was not in good financial shape at that time. Like much of the airline industry, Alaska Airlines was hit with rising fuel and operating costs and was on the verge of bankruptcy. Revenues were significantly reduced when work on the Trans-Alaska Pipeline System was delayed. The airline's cargo aircraft had played a key role in building the pipeline but now sat idle. The airline took another blow on September 4, 1971, when a Boeing 727-100 jetliner crashed on landing in Juneau, killing 111 people and resulting in America's worst single-plane crash at the time. Because the airline was struggling financially, the airline's board ousted the president and CEO Charles Willis. Former board member Ronald Cosgrave succeeded him. The airline was  million in debt when Cosgrave took over, so Cosgrave began to make major cuts. The airline's cargo business was dropped completely, as well as many flights and employees. Cosgrave also sought to improve the airline's tarnished image of "Elastic Airlines" (referring to its poor schedule keeping). The logo was changed to an image of a smiling Eskimo, which remains today. Although the exact identity of the Eskimo is unknown, some believe it to be the face of either Chester Seveck, a reindeer herder in Kotzebue, or Oliver Amouak, an Inupiat Eskimo. Both were Alaskan natives.  As a result of these efforts, the airline made a profit in 1973 and continued to be profitable thereafter.

Post-deregulation expansion (1978–1990)
Alaska Airlines was one of only three US carriers that supported the 1978 Airline Deregulation Act, knowing that it would reap significant growth and other benefits from deregulation. After deregulation, the company's real-estate division was spun off into its own company, with Cosgrave becoming its chairman. Leadership of the airline was passed to Bruce Kennedy, a close associate of Cosgrave. Cosgrave made an alliance with Alaska Airlines to purchase competitor Wien Air Alaska, but this ultimately failed and resulted in fines for Alaska Air and its leaders for improprieties during the attempted acquisition. Wien Air was liquidated in 1984, and never merged into Alaska Airlines.

At the time of deregulation, Alaska Airlines served ten cities in Alaska and one in the contiguous US—the city of Seattle—and it had only ten planes in its fleet. Immediately after deregulation, the airline began to expand, adding the cities of Portland and San Francisco to its network. Soon later, the airline resumed services to the Alaskan cities Nome and Kotzebue, and it also introduced service to Palm Springs, California. Burbank and Ontario were added in 1981. In 1979, Alaska also studied the possibility of acquiring and merging with Hughes Air West, however, this never came to fruition. Other cities in the continental US that were added to the airline's route map by 1985 were Oakland and San Jose in California, Spokane in Washington, Boise in Idaho, and Phoenix and Tucson in Arizona.

Deregulation also brought challenges to the airline, however. The airline was faced with increased competition and inflation that put tremendous pressure on costs, profits, and salaries. By 1979, competitors Northwest Airlines and Western Airlines were both flying wide-body McDonnell Douglas DC-10 jets on the core Anchorage–Seattle nonstop route with additional competition being provided by Wien Air Alaska which had begun flying nonstop jet service between Anchorage and Seattle.  Northwest was operating nonstop DC-10 service on the Fairbanks–Seattle route at this time as well. There were also tensions with unions, particularly mechanics and flight attendants. In 1985, the company had a three-month-long strike with its machinists. By June the same year, it was able to end the strike by promising to reduce labor costs and maintain peace with unions. In November 1985, the airline introduced a daily air-freight service called Gold Streak with service to and from Alaska.

In the 1980s, Alaska Airlines began acquiring McDonnell Douglas MD-80s to replace its aging 727s. Alaska was the launch customer for the MD-83, taking delivery of its first MD-80s in 1985.

Also in 1985, the Alaska Air Group was formed as a holding company for Alaska Airlines. In 1986 Alaska Air Group acquired regional airline Horizon Air, which remained a separate brand from Alaska Airlines; since then, both airlines have been subsidiaries of Alaska Air Group. In 1987, Alaska Airlines purchased Jet America Airlines. Alaska initially operated Jet America as a separate airline, but this proved economically unviable and Jet America's operations were merged into Alaska's. Alaska also discontinued all flights to the Midwest and the East coast formerly operated by Jet America. Additional MD-80s entered the fleet via the acquisition of Jet America Airlines in 1987.

There was also a big seasonal imbalance in travel to Alaska, which mainly took place in the summer. In an effort to compensate for this, the airline introduced service to Mexican resorts, where most travel takes place in the winter. In 1988, the airline began servicing the Mexican resort cities of Mazatlán and Puerto Vallarta. By the end of the 1980s, 70 percent of Alaska Airlines' passengers flew south of Seattle and the airline served 30 cities in 6 states outside Alaska. The airline had successfully used the state of Alaska as a springboard to expand into larger, more profitable markets.

New competition, new technologies (1990s)

The airline began the 1990s with plans to lease 24 Boeing 737-400s from International Lease Finance Corporation (ILFC). The first aircraft was delivered in April 1992.

In 1991, Alaska Airlines added several routes. In the Russian Far East, it added the cities of Magadan and Khabarovsk, as well as service to Toronto, its first Canadian city and the first city east of the Rocky Mountains. However, Toronto was later dropped in 1992 and the Russian destinations in 1998.

As the airline marked its 19th consecutive year of profits in a turbulent industry and racked up many awards for customer service, Bruce Kennedy retired in May 1991 and was succeeded by Raymond J. Vecci.

Alaska Airlines also faced increased competition from low-cost carriers. One carrier that competed with Alaska was MarkAir. Since it began operating in 1984, competition had been reduced because it had worked out feeder agreements with Alaska Airlines. However, after Alaska Air declined to buy the airline in the fall of 1991, it intensified competition with Alaska. Mark Air offered low-cost service on the Anchorage-Seattle route and other routes in Alaska, where Alaska Airlines earned almost one-third of its revenues. This hurt Alaska Airlines; for the first time in 20 years, it posted a loss of  million. To save money, the airline canceled two proposed maintenance facilities and deferred a large aircraft purchase worth  billion. It was able to increase utilization on its existing planes, though. The airline also cut labor costs, but this ended up making relations with unions tense.

The cost reductions produced quick results. In 1993, their losses decreased to  million and they made a  million profit the next year. Eight percent of these revenues were generated by record-setting cargo operations.

Alaska had more competition in 1993 when low-cost airline Southwest Airlines entered the Pacific Northwest by purchasing Morris Air. Nevertheless, Alaska Airlines was able to keep its costs down, but it maintained its high level of customer service. The airline also promoted itself as "the last great airline" and with the motto "For the same price, you just get more", yet analysts felt that Alaska Air needed deeper cost cuts. At the same time, the company had many strikes by the flight attendants' union.

Alaska continued to take delivery of new MD-83s during the 1990s, both to meet the demands of a growing route system, and to replace its aging and fuel inefficient 727 fleet. Their last 727 was retired in March 1994. The airline's MD-80 fleet peaked at 44 aircraft in 1996.

Vecci was dismissed in 1995 and replaced with John Kelly, the former Horizon Air CEO. The airline soon expanded West Coast routes to take advantage of an "open skies" agreement between the US and Canada.

Alaska Airlines also pioneered some new technologies through the 1990s. It added a heads-up guidance system in 1989 to operate better in foggy conditions, becoming the first airline to use this technology. In 1995, the airline became the first U.S. airline to sell tickets on the Internet. By 2000, all the airline's planes carried automated external defibrillators, for use in in-flight emergencies. The airline also installed self-service kiosks called "Instant Travel Machines" that printed boarding passes, allowing customers to bypass the traditional ticket counter. An X-ray device, an addition to the unit allowing passengers to check their own baggage was being tested in 1999 at Anchorage. This concept, known as "Airport of the Future" by the airline, was first tested in Anchorage and was later brought to its Seattle hub, and it drew attention from other airlines as well. The airline would also become the first airline in the world to integrate GPS and Enhanced Ground Proximity Warning System (EGPWS) technology, adding a real-time, three-dimensional display of terrain. The system was operational in all the carrier's Boeing 737-400s by April 1999.

The late 1990s also saw the carrier recording much profitability. The airline added new training and maintenance facilities. Also, the airline began buying new 737s, ordering three Boeing 737-700s and becoming the launch customer for the Boeing 737-900 when it placed an order for ten of the jets in November 1997.

Introducing flights across the U.S. (2000s)

With the delivery of Boeing 737 Next Generation aircraft starting in 1999, Alaska began launching more medium-haul flights. In 2000, Alaska started service between Anchorage and Chicago.

On May 15, 2001, the airline took delivery of its first 737-900. In 2001, the airline was granted slot exemptions by the Department of Transportation to operate a nonstop flight from Ronald Reagan Washington National Airport to Seattle, but it was halted after only a week due to the September 11 attacks. The airline resumed service to Reagan Airport on December 4, 2001, to meet the demand.

In January 2002, William Ayer was named CEO of Alaska Airlines. Ayer had been serving as president under Kelly since 1997, having come to Alaska from Horizon two years earlier after spending 13 years with the smaller airline. Ayer took over as chairman and CEO of the Alaska in 2002 upon Kelly's retirement. He led the company through a transformation called Alaska 2010 that was intended to insulate the airline from the traditional boom-bust cycle of the airline industry.

In 2002, flights to Newark, New Jersey, were launched and in 2003, services to Orlando began. In 2003, service to Boston began.

In 2003, Alaska Airlines won the Technology Leadership Award from the magazine Air Transport World for its pioneering of new technologies both in the airport and within the airplane itself.

In 2005, due to the greater efficiency of the Boeing 737 Next Generation and rising costs for maintenance, fuel, and crew training, Alaska Airlines decided to phase out its remaining 26 MD-80s and trained its pilots to fly the newer Boeing 737-800s that were being ordered to replace them. The last MD-80 flights flew on August 25, 2008, with one flight from San Jose to Seattle and another from Sacramento to Seattle. To mark its transition to an all-Boeing fleet, Alaska Airlines unveiled a 737-800 called Spirit of Seattle with Boeing's house colors painted on the fuselage and the airline's Eskimo logo painted on the tail fin.

Also in 2005, Alaska Airlines contracted out many of its jobs, including ground crew positions, to Menzies Aviation. In some cases, this resulted in an almost 40% decline in wages. This agreement was found to be a violation of union agreements in 2008 and the new ground crews caused enough damage to aircraft in the first year to make the savings negligible. In addition, Menzies contractors gained a reputation of stealing from checked bags after a few incidents in 2007.

Starting in June 2006, Alaska Airlines introduced new cargo aircraft to the fleet: five 737-400C combi aircraft and one 737-400F freighter. The aircraft were originally purchased by Alaska as passenger aircraft in 1992, and converted by Pemco Air Services. The 737-400C "combi" aircraft were uniquely suited for the needs of Alaska, carrying a combination of four cargo pallets and 72 passengers, allowing goods and people to be transported to remote towns. 737-400 based aircraft had 20% more passenger and cargo capacity than the aging Boeing 737-200 cargo aircraft they replaced.

On September 9, 2007, Alaska Airlines introduced daily nonstop service between Portland, Oregon, to Boston. On October 12, 2007, the airline began service to Hawaii with a flight to Honolulu from Seattle. Seattle–Kauai service began on October 28, 2007, and Anchorage–Honolulu service began on December 6, 2007.

On October 26, 2008, Alaska launched service from Seattle to Minneapolis-Saint Paul. On August 3, 2009, service from Seattle to Austin, Texas, began. Service from Seattle to Houston began on September 23, 2009 and from Seattle to Atlanta on October 23, 2009.

2010s

In March 2010, Alaska Airlines began service from San Jose, California, to Kahului and Kona, Hawaii, and also from Sacramento, California, to Kahului, Hawaii.

On September 27, 2010, Alaska Airlines began service between Seattle and Lambert-St. Louis International Airport.

2011 brought a major change for the Alaska Air Group; starting at the beginning of the year, Horizon Air would no longer operate as a separate regional airline. Instead, it transitioned to a capacity purchase agreement (CPA) business model, which had by that time become the regional airline industry standard. Under the CPA, Horizon operates and maintains its aircraft, while Alaska Airlines is responsible for scheduling, marketing and pricing all flights. As part of the change to the new business model, the Horizon Air brand was retired and all Horizon planes were repainted with a co-branded "" livery.

Alaska Airlines also entered into a similar capacity purchase agreement with the nation's largest regional airline, SkyWest Airlines. Starting in May 2011, SkyWest started operating several routes for Alaska under the brand "Alaska SkyWest".

In January 2011, Alaska Airlines placed an order for thirteen 737-900ERs. The aircraft have been delivered between 2012 and 2014 Alaska also ordered two 737-800s as part of this order.

Alaska Airlines continues pioneering new technologies today. In 2011 Alaska Airlines partnered with Boeing and Fujitsu to be the first to use a new technology called Component Management Optimization, which will streamline maintenance checks. It will do this by allowing mechanics to point a handheld device at little RFID tags attached to certain parts of the aircraft, which will display information about when parts were last replaced. This will allow mechanics to perform inspections quicker than conventional methods. The program is scheduled to launch in 2012. Also in mid-2011, the airline issued iPads to its pilots to replace 25 pounds of paper flight manuals that pilots are currently required to carry on flights (Electronic flight bag). Alaska Airlines is the first major airline to use iPads on flights; all pilots had iPads by the middle of June 2011. This was the first part of the airline's initiative to do away with the flight bag; the airline is also considering using iPads for displaying aeronautical charts.

In November 2011 Alaska Airlines flew 75 commercial passenger flights in the U.S. powered by biofuel using a 20 percent blend of sustainable biofuel made from used cooking oil that meets rigorous international safety and sustainability standards.

On February 16, 2012, Alaska Airlines' CEO, Bill Ayer, retired. Ayer became the airline's CEO in 2002 and has been credited for reducing costs and keeping the airline profitable without going through bankruptcy. The airline's president Brad Tilden officially became the new CEO on May 15, 2012.

On March 9, 2012, Alaska Airlines began service from Seattle to Kansas City and on June 11, 2012, began service to Philadelphia. Seattle-Tacoma-Miami International Airport flights ended on July 15, 2012, but service to nearby Fort Lauderdale began on July 16. New service to San Antonio began on September 17, 2012. Alaska Airlines also began service from San Diego to Orlando on October 11, 2012.

In , Alaska placed the largest order in its history when it ordered a total of 50 Boeing 737s in a deal worth  billion at list prices. The order consists of 20 Boeing 737 MAX 8s, 17 Boeing 737 MAX 9s and 13 Boeing 737-900ERs.

Alaska Airlines announced a plan in June 2013 to begin replacing Boeing 737s on flights between Fairbanks and Anchorage, Alaska, with Bombardier Q400s operated by Horizon Air and based out of Anchorage beginning in March 2014. The plan was intended to reduce operating expenses and eventually lower fares but was met with a great deal of skepticism by Fairbanks residents who expressed their frustration about the safety of the aircraft and outside boarding in the cold winter climate through social media. Alaska Airlines responded to the comments on Facebook attempting to reassure passengers of the safety of the Bombardier Q400s as well as promising to address the unusual aspects of flying in Alaska. The airline ended up modifying one of the jetways at Fairbanks International Airport so that passengers would not have to go outside to board. In November 2017, Alaska announced that it would revert to all jet service in the state of Alaska and that it would close its Horizon Airbase in Anchorage in March 2018.

New nonstop service from Seattle to Salt Lake City began in 2013 and from Seattle to Albuquerque, Baltimore, Detroit, New Orleans, Tampa, and Cancun all began in 2014. Several other routes were later added from Salt Lake City in a competitive move against Delta Airlines when that carrier added many new routes from Seattle.

In 2015, Alaska Airlines announced 3 new nonstop destinations from Seattle, to Charleston, Nashville, and Raleigh-Durham. These, along with a flight between Los Angeles and Baltimore, began in late 2015 using their 737 aircraft.

On January 25, 2016, for the first time in 25 years, Alaska Airlines unveiled a major update to its brand, which included a new logo and livery. In the new design, the Alaska wordmark was streamlined and the design of the Eskimo logo was simplified and the ruffs on the parka were made more colorful.

In 2017, Alaska Airlines expanded to Indianapolis, with non-stop service to Seattle in May and San Francisco in September. The San Francisco route was discontinued in September 2018.

In September 2018, Alaska Airlines added non-stop service from Seattle to Pittsburgh.

Virgin America acquisition 

On April 4, 2016, Alaska Air Group announced it would acquire Virgin America, an airline based out of the San Francisco Bay Area. With Virgin America operating hubs in San Francisco and Los Angeles, the merger greatly expanded the presence of Alaska Airlines in California and the West Coast.

After the acquisition was announced, Richard Branson, the head of the Virgin Group and one of the founders of Virgin America, described himself as "sad" and disappointed. Despite the protest from its most high-profile shareholder, the majority of Virgin America's shareholders voted to approve the sale to Alaska Air Group.

Alaska Air Group purchased Virgin America for $57 per share, a total valuation of $2.6 billion, with additional expenses bringing the cost to approximately $4 billion. The acquisition was completed on December 14, 2016.

The DOT issued a single operating certificate for the combined airlines on January 11, 2018. The airlines merged into the same passenger service system on April 25, 2018, meaning that most of the customer-facing portions of the company (including flight numbers, website, mobile apps, and airport check-in kiosks) have a single brand: Alaska Airlines. Virgin America's final flight was on April 24, 2018.  The last Virgin America aircraft was repainted on June 2, 2019.

The acquisition created one issue for the enlarged Group: Alaska operates an all-Boeing 737 fleet of aircraft, but Virgin America operated an all-Airbus fleet. Even though the 737 and A320 family jets are designed to operate in the same segment – short-to-medium-range segment of up to 200 passengers – the two jets are very different in terms of operation, and anyone wishing to change from a 737 to an Airbus A320 family jet (or vice versa) needs to go through a lengthy training course, a costly process for the airline. The first Airbus leases expired in 2019, with more set to expire between 2021 and 2024. In April 2020, in response to route suspensions stemming from the COVID-19 pandemic, Alaska grounded 19 inherited Virgin America aircraft, with 12 permanently retired and the other 7 unlikely to return to service; the airline is using pandemic-related flight reductions as an opportunity to retrain many Airbus pilots to fly the Boeing 737 instead.

2020s 
Due to the economic effects of the COVID-19 pandemic, Alaska Airlines announced that it will be reducing its number of employees by 30%. By the end of 2020, the firm is set to cut out around 7,000 job positions out of its 23,000 total.

In February 2020, Alaska Airlines announced its intention to join the Oneworld airline alliance. On March 31, 2021, Alaska Airlines officially joined the Oneworld alliance, adding seven new airline partners, including Iberia, Malaysia Airlines, Qatar Airways, Royal Air Maroc, Royal Jordanian, S7 Airlines, and SriLankan Airlines.

On December 22, 2020, Alaska Airlines agreed to buy 23 Boeing 737 MAX 9 jets.

In November 2021, Alaska Airlines launched seasonal service to Belize, making it the fourth foreign country served by the airline.

In August 2022, Alaska Airlines was reported to be an investor in Twelve, a sustainable aviation fuel (SAF) start up and chemical technology company based in Berkeley, California, that aims to make fuel out of carbon dioxide instead of things like organic vegetable oils, which would supposedly be cheaper than existing SAF production. Twelve’s E-Jet fuel would have 90% lower emissions than conventional fuel but not require changing existing aircraft. At proper scale, it would be cost competitive with existing fuel and be helpful in allowing Alaska Airlines to meet emissions goals.

In October 2022, Alaska Airlines announced an agreement with Boeing to purchase 52 additional Boeing 737 MAX aircraft, the airline's largest aircraft order thus far.

In January 2023, Alaska Airlines announced that it had officially dropped plastic cups from its inflight food and beverage services,  becoming the first U.S. airline to do so. It said that the move is part of plans to replace its top five waste-producing items from onboard services by 2025.

Destinations

Alaska's route system spans more than 115 destinations in the United States, Belize, Canada, Costa Rica, and Mexico. Some of the locations served in the carrier's namesake state include Anchorage, Adak, Barrow, Cordova, Fairbanks, Juneau, Ketchikan, Kodiak, Kotzebue, King Salmon, Nome, Prudhoe Bay, and Sitka, several of which are inaccessible by road. The airline began scheduled operations to the Russian Far East in 1991 following the breakup of the Soviet Union, but suspended the service in 1998 following the 1998 Russian financial crisis.

Alaska has historically been one of the largest carriers on the West Coast of the United States, with strong presences in Anchorage, Seattle, Portland, and San Diego, and serving four airports in the Bay Area and four airports in the Los Angeles metropolitan area.

Some cities in Alaska's network with less traffic are served by regional airline partners under a capacity purchase agreement. Under that agreement, the regional airline is paid to operate and maintain aircraft used on flights that are scheduled and marketed by Alaska Airlines. Alaska's airline partners include wholly-owned regional subsidiary Horizon Air and carrier SkyWest Airlines.

Codeshare agreements
Alaska Airlines is a member of the Oneworld alliance and has codeshares or mileage partnerships with the following airlines:

 Aer Lingus
 Air Tahiti Nui
 American Airlines
 British Airways 
 Cathay Pacific
 Condor
 El Al
 Fiji Airways
 Finnair
 Hainan Airlines
 Iberia
 Icelandair
 Japan Airlines
 Korean Air
 LATAM Chile
 Malaysia Airlines
 Qantas
 Qatar Airways
 Ravn Alaska 
 Royal Air Maroc
 Royal Jordanian
 S7 Airlines
 Singapore Airlines
 SriLankan Airlines

Fleet

Alaska Airlines operates a mainline fleet consisting primarily of Boeing 737 series aircraft, with some Airbus A321neo aircraft ordered by Virgin America, but delivered after the merger. Regional flights are operated with Embraer 175 jets by the Alaska-owned regional airline Horizon Air and contractor SkyWest Airlines.

Alaska Airlines operated with an all–Boeing 737 mainline fleet from August 25, 2008, until January 11, 2018, at which time Alaska officially took possession of Virgin America's fleet of Airbus aircraft. The airline's long-term strategy is to return to operating an all–Boeing 737 mainline fleet, but the transition has taken several years, as most of the Airbus A320 family aircraft are leased, with contracts set to expire between 2021 and 2024.

Services

Cabin
First Class features priority boarding, and complimentary foods as well as alcoholic and non-alcoholic beverages. Seating is in a 2-2 configuration featuring recliner style seats on mainline aircraft and a 2-1 configuration on regional jets.

 is located in the first few rows of the economy cabin and features 35" of seat pitch, four more inches than in Alaska's Main Cabin. Passengers receive priority boarding and complimentary alcoholic or non-alcoholic beverages. Foods can be purchased. Premium Class seating can be either purchased during booking or given through complimentary upgrades for elite fliers in Alaska's Mileage Plan loyalty program. Premium Class was announced by Alaska at the end of 2015 and implemented through a gradual rollout that lasted from 2016 to 2017.

Main Cabin is Alaska's economy class offering. Main Cabin passengers receive a complimentary non-alcoholic beverages. Foods and alcoholic beverages are available for purchase.  On mainline aircraft, every seat in Main Cabin offers USB and power outlets.

In-flight services

Meals and beverages
Complimentary meals or light snacks are served to passengers in the first class cabin. In 2006 the airline launched its buy on board meal program, known as Northern Bites, on most flights over 2 ½ hours, including all transcontinental flights. As part of the buy on board program, the airline offers various "Picnic Packs" for a charge in coach/economy class on all flights.

On February 1, 2012, Alaska Airlines started serving coffee from fellow Seattle company Starbucks on all of its flights. Previously Starbucks coffee was only offered on Horizon Air flights. Horizon Air had offered Starbucks coffee since February 1, 1990, and was the first airline in the world to serve Starbucks coffee onboard its flights. Alaska also provides local offerings such as Beecher's Cheese, Tim's Cascade potato chips and Alaskan Amber beer.

In 2015, Alaska updated inflight hot entrées with options created by Seattle Chef Tom Douglas.

In July 2018, Alaska Airlines updated much of the First Class menu inspired by the airlines' West Coast presence. New items served included Oregon's Salt and Straw Caramel Ribbon Ice Cream, brownies from Los Angeles-based Sweet Lady Jane, and pasta from Cucina Fresca, based in Seattle. New features included ordering food before flights to allow for meals ready upon seating.

In-flight internet access
All Alaska Airlines jets are equipped with an in-flight Wi-Fi and streaming entertainment system. It had been announced that soon internet access service will move to a flat $8 charge per flight, but that change is only applies to the satellite WiFi based aircraft. On the older systems internet service is still fee-based for all passengers, depending on the length of the flight. Streaming entertainment and electronic messaging services are free.

Alaska launched trials of In-flight Wi-Fi Internet service in 2009. The airline tested both the Row44 satellite-based system, before picking the land-based Gogo Inflight Internet system on February 24, 2010. In October 2010, flights between Anchorage and Fairbanks became the first to receive in-flight internet service. In the following months, the system was expanded to cover all routes over the United States served by the airline with the exception of to and from Hawaii. Alaska Airlines began switching to a satellite-based system in the third quarter of 2019, which is available on all flights, including flights over the Atlantic and Pacific oceans. As of February 2020, 126 of 241 aircraft have satellite WiFi installed.

Reward programs

Mileage Plan

The frequent-flyer program of Alaska Airlines and subsidiary Horizon Air is called Mileage Plan. The program's airline partners include members of all three major airline alliances (Oneworld, SkyTeam, and Star Alliance), as well as several unaffiliated carriers. The Mileage Plan program has no membership fee and allows one-way redemption; accumulated miles expire after 2 years of inactivity.  The Plan has elite tiers (MVP, MVP Gold, MVP Gold 75K, and MVP Gold 100k) for frequent travelers, who are provided with increased travel benefits.

Club 49
On November 1, 2011, Alaska Airlines began a new program, called Club 49, exclusively for Mileage Plan members who are residents of Alaska.  Benefits include free checked bags and email notifications about fare sales and discounts. The program has no joining fee and memberships are valid for a year after joining before they need to be renewed.

Alaska Lounge
The airline operates eight Alaska Lounges: Seattle–Tacoma International Airport, Alaska's largest hub, has three lounges, while Anchorage Airport, San Francisco International Airport, John F. Kennedy International Airport, Los Angeles International Airport, and Portland International Airport each have one. In addition, Oneworld lounges are now also available for Alaska passengers.

Corporate affairs

Alaska Air Cargo

Alaska Air Cargo has regional operations in parts of the United States and has the most extensive air cargo operations on the west coast of the U.S., larger than that of any other passenger airline. Alaska's cargo operations are focused primarily on the northwestern contiguous states and Alaska, between Anchorage and Seattle. South from Alaska, goods that are carried primarily include fresh Alaskan seafood, while products carried north from Seattle primarily include U.S. Postal Service mail; in addition, the airline also carries goods for remote Alaskan communities and personal packages.

Philanthropy
The Alaska Airlines Foundation, headquartered on the grounds of Ted Stevens International Airport in Anchorage, gives grants to 501(c)(3) non-profit organizations that are classified as charities in Alaska and Washington.

Worker relations
Alaska's pilot group is represented by the Air Line Pilots Association, International and its flight attendants are represented by the Association of Flight Attendants.

Since , the airline's baggage-handling operations have been outsourced to Menzies Aviation. This was in response to the rejection of a contract between IAM (the union which represented the baggage handlers), and Alaska Airlines. It also allowed the airline to save an estimated $13 million a year. In late 2016, Alaska Airlines created a wholly owned subsidiary McGee Air Services which would compete with Menzies Aviation for ground handling contracts in select Alaska cities.

Accidents and incidents

Alaska Airlines has had eleven major aviation accidents in its long history, nine of which resulted in deaths, with the other two resulting in the aircraft being written off but no deaths. A total of 226 passengers and crew along with two people on the ground have been killed.

On November 30, 1947, Flight 009, a Douglas C-54A (NC91009), with routing Anchorage–Yakutat–Port Hardy–Seattle, crash-landed while attempting to make an ILS approach at Seattle–Tacoma International Airport in Seattle. The plane went off the runway, rolled down an embankment, struck a ditch, and continued into the intersection of the Des Moines Highway and South 188th Street where it struck an automobile, caught fire and spilled fuel over the area. Of the 28 occupants, eight died, plus the driver of the car. The crash was attributed to pilot error.
Of the six passengers on board, five died. The cause was determined to be the pilot straying off the designated airway.
Both pilots died.
On March 2, 1957, Flight 100, a Douglas C-54B (N90449) on the routing of Seattle–Fairbanks–Seattle hit a mountain  from Blyn while on approach to Seattle. All five occupants died. The cause of the crash was the pilot's decision to enter an area of low overcast in mountainous terrain, as well as a navigation error.
On July 21, 1961, Flight 779, a Douglas DC-6A (N6118C) operating Seattle-–Shemya crashed short of the runway, killing the six crew. The cause of the crash was that the power to the runway and approach lighting systems had been cut off two days earlier, and the control tower neglected to inform the pilots this as they made their approach in the dark.
On April 17, 1967, An Alaska Airlines Lockheed L-1049H Super Constellation (N7777C) with 28 passengers and four crew members aboard landed with the landing gear retracted during heavy snowfall at Kotzebue Airport. Everyone on board survived but the aircraft was damaged beyond repair.
All seven crew members and 104 passengers were killed. The cause of the crash was determined to be misleading navigational information given to the flight crew, the failure of the crew to use all navigational aids and not performing the required audio identification of the navigational facilities.
On April 5, 1976, Flight 60, a Boeing 727-81 (N124AS) operating Juneau–Ketchikan overran the runway while landing in Ketchikan after the captain decided to attempt a go-around at the last moment. One passenger died in the accident. The cause of the crash was determined to be pilot error for initiating a go-around after commitment to landing and the pilot's "unprofessional decision" to abandon the precision approach.
On June 9, 1987, an Alaska Airlines Boeing 727-90C (N766AS) at Anchorage International Airport with two people on board struck a jetway while taxiing and caught fire, destroying the aircraft. The avionics technician inadvertently deactivated the brake pressurization system.
On March 13, 1990, an Alaska Airlines Boeing 727 taking off from Phoenix Sky Harbor International Airport struck and killed a man who ran onto the runway. There were no injuries on the 727. Airport authorities determined that the man was a patient at a nearby mental hospital.
On January 31, 2000, Flight 261, a McDonnell Douglas MD-80, crashed into the Pacific Ocean near Anacapa Island, in the California Channel Islands, while preparing to attempt an emergency landing at LAX en route from Puerto Vallarta, Mexico, to San Francisco and Seattle, killing all 88 people on board. In its report, the National Transportation Safety Board (NTSB) determined the cause of the accident to be the failure of acme nut threads, which were part of the jackscrew assembly for the horizontal stabilizer's trim system. The failure happened because of insufficient lubrication of the jackscrew assembly, which was the result of Alaska's extended lubrication and inspection intervals and from the Federal Aviation Administration's approval of those intervals. NTSB also found that the lack of a fail-safe mechanism for the failure of the acme nut threads on the MD-80 design contributed to the accident. This incident, along with an earlier ValuJet Flight 592 crash, led to closer FAA oversight of airline maintenance operations. The accident was also the subject of episode 5, season 1 and episode 5, season 22  of the documentary series Mayday (Air Emergency/Air Crash Investigation) titled "Fatal Flaw" and "Pacific Plunge" Respectively.
On November 14, 2020, Flight 66, a Boeing 737-700, hit and killed a brown bear while landing at the Yakutat Airport in Alaska.

Employee incidents

On September 2, 2019, an Alaska Airlines flight attendant called for an evacuation of Terminal A of the Newark Liberty International Airport, causing panic among Labor Day travelers.  The flight attendant was subsequently detained by police who determined that the incident was a false alarm; the employee reportedly suffered from a mental health-related issue at the time.

See also
List of airlines of Alaska
 Air transportation in the United States

Notes

References

External links

 
 Alaska Airlines Current Fleet

Alaska Air Group
1932 establishments in Alaska
Airlines based in Alaska
Airlines based in Washington (state)
Airlines established in 1932
Airlines for America members
American companies established in 1932
Companies based in King County, Washington
Former seaplane operators
SeaTac, Washington